Beinn Dearg (1,009 m) is a mountain in the Grampian Mountains of Scotland. It lies north of the Perth and Kinross village of Blair Atholl, in the Forest of Atholl.

It makes for a long but straightforward hill walk in the summer months and the views are extensive from its summit.

References

Mountains and hills of Perth and Kinross
Marilyns of Scotland
Munros
One-thousanders of Scotland